Bijakovići is a village in the municipality of Čitluk, Bosnia and Herzegovina.

The village is within the area served by the Franciscans of Medjugorje. In 1981, Mount Podbrdo in Bijakovići was the site of the initial alleged apparitions of the image the visionaries referred to as Gospa.

The Croatian-Canadian businessman and arms smuggler Anton Kikaš was born in Bijakovići.

Demographics 
According to the 2013 census, its population was 1,438.

References

Populated places in Čitluk, Bosnia and Herzegovina